Lorenzo Trejo Valencia (born 15 June 1977), known as Lorenzo Trejo, is a Mexican boxer.

World title fights
In 2003, he lost to Iván Calderón for the World Boxing Organization minimumweight world title.

In 2006, Trejo lost to Eagle Kyowa for the World Boxing Council minimumweight world title.

In 2007, Trejo lost to Édgar Sosa for the World Boxing Council light flyweight world title.

Other notable opponents
Trejo lost to Antonio Nieves in 2015.

References

External links

1977 births
Living people
Bantamweight boxers
Mexican male boxers